Rouf is a neighborhood of Athens, Greece. It is located to the west of the Athens centre, between Piraeus and Petrou Ralli Avenue. Rouf is named after a Bavarian businessman who, during Otto's reign, bought large areas in this location to make a farm. When the railway passed through this area, the local station was named Rouf. During the interwar period, a camp was built in Rouf. In 1947, the local team of Rouf was founded under the name Asteras Rouf and later renamed to PAO Rouf.

References

Neighbourhoods in Athens